Table Mountain, el.  is the highest peak in the Highland Mountains in Madison County, Montana. It is located in Beaverhead-Deerlodge National Forest.  Headwaters of Moose Creek, Fish Creek and Hell's Canyon Creek, all significant tributaries of the Jefferson River flow off the face of the mountain.

See also
 Mountains of Madison County, Montana

Notes

Mountains of Madison County, Montana
Mountains of Montana